Toomas Proovel (born 29 September 1973) is an Estonian wrestler. He competed in the men's Greco-Roman 85 kg at the 2000 Summer Olympics.

References

External links
 

1973 births
Living people
Estonian male sport wrestlers
Olympic wrestlers of Estonia
Wrestlers at the 2000 Summer Olympics
Sportspeople from Tartu